is one of the techniques adopted later by the Kodokan into their Shinmeisho No Waza (newly accepted techniques) list. It is categorized as a side sacrifice technique, Yoko-sutemi.

Technique Description 
www.judoinfo.com

Exemplar videos:

Tournament
from
www.judoinfo.com

Similar Techniques, Variants, and Aliases 
Soto Makikomi, Hane Makikomi

Included Systems 
Judo

Technique History

References

External links
Judo Techniques by type.
Judo Lists by rank.

Judo technique